Thelenella is a genus of lichen-forming fungi in the family Thelenellaceae. It has 30 species. The genus was circumscribed by Finnish lichenologist William Nylander in 1855, with Thelenella modesta assigned as the type species.

Species
Thelenella brasiliensis 
Thelenella calcicola 
Thelenella cinerascens 
Thelenella fugiens 
Thelenella fusispora 
Thelenella geminipara 
Thelenella haradae 
Thelenella humilis 
Thelenella indica  – India
Thelenella inductula 
Thelenella justii 
Thelenella kerguelena 
Thelenella larbalestieri 
Thelenella lateralis 
Thelenella luridella 
Thelenella luzonensis 
Thelenella marginata 
Thelenella mawsonii 
Thelenella melanospora 
Thelenella modesta 
Thelenella monospora  – Brazil
Thelenella muscorum 
Thelenella nubifera 
Thelenella philippina 
Thelenella rappii 
Thelenella sampaiana 
Thelenella sastreana 
Thelenella sychnogonioides 
Thelenella tasmanica 
Thelenella vezdae 
Thelenella weberi

References

Ostropales
Lecanoromycetes genera
Lichen genera
Taxa described in 1855
Taxa named by William Nylander (botanist)